Trewinnion is a hamlet in mid Cornwall, England, United Kingdom. It is situated north of the village of Summercourt about four miles (6.5 km) south-west of Newquay. The settlement consists of a large farmstead and several cottages. Trewinnion was formerly a manor in the ancient parish of St Enoder which was mortgaged in the 1850s by the Mohun family.

References

 Records held by Cornwall County Council.
 Ordnance Survey, 1:25000 'Explorer' map, sheet 106, 

Hamlets in Cornwall